The fractional excretion of sodium (FENa) is the percentage of the sodium filtered by the kidney which is excreted in the urine.  It is measured in terms of plasma and urine sodium, rather than by the interpretation of urinary sodium concentration alone, as urinary sodium concentrations can vary with water reabsorption.  Therefore, the urinary and plasma concentrations of sodium must be compared to get an accurate picture of kidney clearance. In clinical use, the fractional excretion of sodium can be calculated as part of the evaluation of acute kidney failure in order to determine if hypovolemia or decreased effective circulating plasma volume is a contributor to the kidney failure.

Calculation
FENa is calculated in two parts—figuring out how much sodium is excreted in the urine, and then finding its ratio to the total amount of sodium that passed through (aka "filtered by") the kidney.

First, the actual amount of sodium excreted is calculated by multiplying the urine sodium concentration by the urinary flow rate. This is the numerator in the equation. The denominator is the total amount of sodium filtered by the kidneys. This is calculated by multiplying the plasma sodium concentration by the glomerular filtration rate calculated using creatinine filtration. This formula is represented mathematically as:

[(Sodiumurinary × Flow rateurinary) ÷ ((Sodiumplasma) × ((Creatinineurinary × Flow rateurinary) ÷ (Creatinineplasma)))] × 100

Sodium (mmol/L)
Creatinine (mg/dL)

The flow rates cancel out in the above equation, simplifying to the standard equation:

For ease of recall, one can just remember the fractional excretion of sodium is the clearance of sodium divided by the glomerular filtration rate (i.e. the "fraction" excreted).

Interpretation
FENa can be useful in the evaluation of acute kidney failure in the context of low urine output. Low fractional excretion indicates sodium retention by the kidney, suggesting pathophysiology extrinsic to the urinary system such as volume depletion or decrease in effective circulating volume (e.g. low output heart failure). Higher values can suggest sodium wasting due to acute tubular necrosis or other causes of intrinsic kidney failure. The FENa may be affected or invalidated by diuretic use, since many diuretics act by altering the kidney's handling of sodium.

Exceptions in children and neonates
While the above values are useful for older children and adults, the FENa must be interpreted more cautiously in younger pediatric patients due to the limited ability of immature tubules to reabsorb sodium maximally.  Thus, in term neonates, a FENa of <3% represents volume depletion, and a FENa as high as 4% may represent maximal sodium conservation in critically ill preterm neonates.  The FENa may also be spuriously elevated in children with adrenal insufficiency or pre-existing kidney disease (such as obstructive uropathy) due to salt wasting.

Exceptions in adults
The FENa is generally less than 1% in patients with hepatorenal syndrome and acute glomerulonephropathy. Although often reliable at discriminating between prerenal azotemia and acute tubular necrosis, the FENa has been reported to be <1% occasionally with oliguric and nonoliguric acute tubular necrosis, urinary tract obstruction, acute glomerulonephritis, renal allograft rejection, sepsis, and drug-related alterations in renal hemodynamics. Therefore, the utility of the test is best when used in conjunction with other clinical data.

Alternatives
Fractional excretion of other substances can be measured to determine kidney clearance including urea, uric acid, and lithium. These can be used in patients undergoing diuretic therapy, since diuretics induce a natriuresis.  Thus, the urinary sodium concentration and FENa may be higher in patients receiving diuretics in spite of prerenal pathology.

See also
 Urinary index

References

External links
 Fractional Excretion of Sodium Calculator by MDCalc
 FENa Calculator
 Online FENa calculator by Cornell University

Urine
Kidney